Allen Ernest Winter (8 December 1903 – 8 July 1997) was an Australia Anglican bishop. He was the long-serving second bishop of the former Diocese of St Arnaud in north-west Victoria.

Winter was educated at Melbourne Grammar School and University College, Oxford. He was ordained in 1928 and was a curate at Christ Church, South Yarra, and then St James' Ivanhoe. He then held incumbencies at Sunshine, Brighton and Essendon. From 1948 he was a canon residentiary at All Saints' Cathedral, Bathurst, until his ordination to the episcopate.

References

Notes

1903 births
1997 deaths
People educated at Melbourne Grammar School
People educated at Trinity College (University of Melbourne)
Alumni of University College, Oxford
Anglican bishops of St Arnaud
20th-century Anglican bishops in Australia